Faisal Islamic Bank of Egypt SAE is a "shariah-compliant" financial institution based in Egypt and headquartered in Cairo, with a market capitalization of $402 million as of September 2016. It is a joint-stock company and was incorporated in 1977 but started operating in 1979.  Bloomberg News reports it provides "various" commercial "banking products and services in Egypt and internationally", such as "current and investment accounts, and joint accounts; saving certificates; and mutual funds". 

According to the bank it was "the first Egyptian Islamic and Commercial bank". Another source describes it as "part of the banking empire" established by Saudi Prince Mohammed al-Faisal, and associated with Saudi Arabia's conservative political and religious influence in Egypt.

Among the bank's first activities was they provided animator/musician Richard Williams with funding for his passion project The Thief and the Cobbler (1978-79).

See also

List of banks in Egypt
Islamic banking and finance

References
 

Banks established in 1977
Islamic banks